Herbert Edward "Bert" Brown (fl. 1922–1926) was an English professional footballer who played as an outside right.

Career
Brown was born in Nottingham. He played for Crewe Alexandra, Welbeck Colliery Welfare, Bradford City, Middlesbrough and York City. For Bradford City, he made six appearances (one goal) in the Football League, and for York City he made 35 appearances (six goals) in the Midland League.

References

Year of birth missing
Footballers from Nottingham
Year of death missing
English footballers
Association football outside forwards
Crewe Alexandra F.C. players
Welbeck Welfare F.C. players
Bradford City A.F.C. players
Middlesbrough F.C. players
York City F.C. players
English Football League players
Midland Football League players